Langelurillus alboguttatus is  a jumping spider species in the genus Langelurillus that lives in Tanzania. The male was first described in 2000; the female has yet to be described. The species is similar to Langelurillus furcatus, but has a different coloration pattern and three tibial apophyses.

References

Endemic fauna of Tanzania
Fauna of Tanzania
Salticidae
Spiders described in 2000
Spiders of Africa
Taxa named by Wanda Wesołowska